Windsong is the ninth studio album recorded by American singer-songwriter John Denver, which was released in September 1975. Denver's popularity was at its peak by this time.

The album contained the songs "I'm Sorry" and "Calypso," which comprised a two-sided hit for Denver in the fall of 1975. "Looking for Space" was dedicated to Werner Erhard, "Two Shots" to Michael P. Shore and "Calypso" to Captain Jacques-Yves Cousteau and all those who served on his ship, Calypso.

Track listing
All tracks composed by John Denver; except where indicated

Side one
 "Windsong" (Denver, Joe Henry) – 3:57
 "Cowboy’s Delight" (Bob Carpenter, David James Holster) – 3:05
 "Spirit" (Denver, Joe Henry) – 3:33
 "Looking for Space" – 3:56
 "Shipmates and Cheyenne" (music: Denver; lyrics: Joe Henry) – 3:22
 "Late Nite Radio" (Bill Danoff, Taffy Danoff) – 2:44

Side two
 "Love Is Everywhere" (music: John Sommers; lyrics: John Denver, Joe Henry, Steve Weisberg, John Sommers) – 3:30
 "Two Shots" – 3:29
 "I'm Sorry" – 3:29
 "Fly Away" – 4:08
 "Calypso" – 3:32
 "Song of Wyoming" (Kent Lewis) – 3:19

Personnel
John Denver – vocals, 6 and 12-string acoustic guitars
Hal Blaine – drums, percussion
Dick Kniss – double bass
John Sommers – banjo, acoustic guitar, mandolin, fiddle, backing vocals
Steve Weisberg – electric and acoustic guitars, pedal steel guitar, electric and acoustic dobros, backing vocals
Byron Berline – mandolin, fiddle on "Love is Everywhere"
Mary Ann Duffy – vocals on "Late Nite Radio" and "Love is Everywhere"
Olivia Newton-John – backing vocals on "Fly Away"
Jesse Ehrlich – cello on "Windsong"
John Ellis – oboe on "Windsong"
Jimmie Fadden – harmonica on "Song of Wyoming"
Lee Holdridge – arranger, conductor
Technical
Kris O'Connor – production assistance
Mickey Crofford – engineer
Acy Lehman – art direction
Albert MacKenzie Watson – cover photography

Charts

Weekly charts

Year-end charts

Certifications

References

John Denver albums
1975 albums
Albums arranged by Lee Holdridge
Albums produced by Milt Okun
RCA Records albums